No me defiendas compadre ("Don't defend me, friend") is a 1949 Mexican film. It was produced by Fernando de Fuentes.

External links
 

1949 films
1940s Spanish-language films
Mexican black-and-white films
Mexican comedy films
1949 comedy films
1940s Mexican films